Season thirty-four of the television program American Experience aired on the PBS network in the United States on February 7, 2022 and concluded on November 15, 2022. The season contained six new episodes and began with the film Riveted: The History of Jeans.

Episodes

References

2022 American television seasons
American Experience